Still Fantasy is the seventh studio album by Taiwanese singer Jay Chou, released on 5 September 2006 by Sony Music Taiwan, Alfa Music & Virgin Records Taiwan.

The album was nominated for three Golden Melody Awards. The album also won an IFPI Hong Kong Top Sales Music Award for Best Selling Mandarin Album of the Year. The track, "Chrysanthemum Terrace," won a Hong Kong Film Award for Best Original Film Song.

The tracks, "Far Away," "Listen to Mom," and "White Windmill," are listed at number 2, number 8 and number 53 respectively on 2006's Hit FM Top Singles of the Year chart.

Track listing

Awards

References

External links
  Jay Chou discography@JVR Music
 

2006 albums
Jay Chou albums
Sony Music Taiwan albums